Jaz Hedgeland (born 21 June 1995) is an Australian triathlete. She competed in the women's event at the 2020 Summer Olympics.

References

External links
 

1995 births
Living people
Australian female triathletes
Olympic triathletes of Australia
Triathletes at the 2020 Summer Olympics
Sportspeople from Perth, Western Australia
Sportswomen from Western Australia
21st-century Australian women